"Generation Love" is a song recorded by American singer and actress Jennette McCurdy from her self-titled debut album. Written by Ross Copperman, Tom Douglas and Heather Morgan and produced by Jay DeMarcus of Rascal Flatts, "Generation Love" was released digitally as a single on March 11, 2011, and was later serviced to country radio on April 25, 2011. The song was included on the iCarly soundtrack album, iCarly: iSoundtrack II.

"Generation Love" has been praised by music critics and became McCurdy's best performing single on the Billboard Hot Country Songs chart.

Composition
"Generation Love" is a modern country song, featuring pedal steel guitar and melodic banjo, while also having pop influences. The song's female narrator laments on the modern generation, which is seen as selfish and caught up in mainly the technological world, but also have problems such as being children of divorce and victims of dysfunction. It is contrasted with the early generations of the Great Depression, war veterans and the post-World War II generation that performed feats such as landing on the moon.

Cristen Maher of Taste of Country describes the song as, "slower in tempo and truly showcases McCurdy's vocals." Additionally, Maher adds, "As the melody of the song builds towards the chorus, a banjo joins the mix of twangy guitars and beating drums, giving the song a true country feel."

Promotion and performances 
To promote the single, McCurdy headlined her own mall tour, Generation Love for St. Jude. McCurdy traveled to and performed at multiple different malls within the United States. All proceeds from the event went towards St. Jude Children's Research Hospital.

Music video
The music video, which was directed by Roman White premiered on CMT around April 29, 2011. The video opens with McCurdy singing on the rooftop of a building with the ground littered with paper hearts. Throughout the video, it shows the younger generation with white balloons with a red heart on them, while others hold up signs of things they do to help the community. The younger generation passes the balloon on to the older generation, who eventually let them go and into the air. At the end of the video, the sky behind McCurdy is filled with balloons and she releases her own balloon into the sky.

Track listing 

 Digital download

 "Generation Love" (Single Version) – 3:37

 CD single

 "Generation Love" (Single Version) – 3:37

Credits and personnel 
Credits adapted from Jennette McCurdy liner notes.
 Jennette McCurdy – vocals
 Russel Terrell – background vocals
 Tom Douglas – songwriter
 Heather Morgan – songwriter
 Ross Copperman – songwriter
 Jay DeMarcus – producer
 Chris McHugh – drums
 Mark Hill – bass
 Ilya Toshinsky – acoustic guitar
 Tom Bukovac – electric guitar
 Charlie Judge – keyboard
 Paul Franklin - steel guitar

Charts and performance
"Generation Love" debuted at number 57 on the U.S. Billboard Hot Country Songs chart for the week starting May 14, 2011.

Release history

References

2011 singles
Jennette McCurdy songs
Music videos directed by Roman White
Capitol Records Nashville singles
Country ballads
Songs written by Tom Douglas (songwriter)
Songs written by Ross Copperman
Songs written by Heather Morgan (songwriter)
2011 songs
2010s ballads